Dáin or Dain can refer to:

In Norse mythology:
Dáinn (Norse dwarf) or Dáin, a dwarf
Dáinn, one of the four stags of Yggdrasill
Dáinn, an elf who introduced the runes to his race according to Hávamál
Dáin II Ironfoot, dwarf-king from J. R. R. Tolkien's Middle-earth legendarium
Dain (unit), an obsolete unit of measurement in Myanmar equalling ca 3.9 kilometres; see also Bamboo (unit)

See also
Dain, a surname
Dainn (disambiguation)
Dane (disambiguation)